Hero (trans. Geroj or Geroy) is a 2019 Russian spy action comedy film directed by Karen Oganesyan. It stars Alexander Petrov as Andrey Rodin, Russian spy who was forced to back to action after years away from his homeland. The film also features Svetlana Khodchenkova, Vladimir Mashkov and Konstantin Lavronenko.

The shooting took 47 shifts - from April to June 2018. In addition, several scenes due to the crazy business of the leading actors had to be finished in a year.
The film was shot in the cities of Riga, Jurmala and Sigulda, Latvia, in the Republic of Crimea and the Kaliningrad Oblast, Russia.

Hero is scheduled to be released for September 26, 2019 in Russia by Central Partnership.

Plot
Andrey Rodin was trained 15 years ago in a special school of the Foreign Intelligence Service (SVR), where agents were trained from teenagers. In the early 2000s, the project was closed, and the main character has long settled in one of the European cities and no longer remembers Russia.

Once he picks up the phone and hears the voice of his father, who is considered dead. He informs Andrey Rodin that he is open for hunting. Unknown services are trying to destroy him and he can only escape. Andrey Rodin now has a desire not only to survive, but also to find his father again. To the aid of the protagonist comes his first love, Masha, who also has an interest in everything that happens. Andrey is getting more and more involved in espionage game, not realizing the true scale.

Cast
 Alexander Petrov as Andrey Olegovich Rodin, Russian spy, Oleg Rodin's son of a scout, mnemonics.
 Yan Alabushev as Young Andrey Rodin
 Svetlana Khodchenkova as Mariya "Masha" Rakhmanova, Andrey Rodin's love interest, scout.
 Vladimir Mashkov as Oleg Rodin, Andrey Rodin's father, Former SVR Colonel, curator of the intelligence school "Youth".
 Konstantin Lavronenko as Maksim Mikhailovich Kataev, SVR officer
 Marina Petrenko as Zotova, operations officer from the headquarters of the SVR in Moscow.
 Anastasiya Todoresku as Helena Burger, SVR agent
 Tobias Aspelin as Mark Polson, a wealthy US businessman
 Aaryaman Patnaik as Aary, an Indian tourist

Production

Filming 
Filming began in April 2018 and takes place in Europe, Kaliningrad and Moscow. Actors had to perform tricks on the ground, in water and in the air. In one scene, the heroes fly off a balloon in wingsuits (winged overalls), and in another they jump from the roof of a 27-story skyscraper.

See also
 List of films featuring surveillance

References

External links
  
 

2019 films
2010s Russian-language films
2010s spy comedy films
2019 action comedy films
Russian spy action films
2010s spy action films
Russian Foreign Intelligence Service in fiction
2010s chase films
Russian spy thriller films
Films set in 2019
Films set in Moscow
Films set in Russia
Films set in Zürich
Films set in Berlin
Films shot in the Czech Republic
Films shot in Moscow
Films shot in Crimea
Films shot in Russia
Films shot in Paris
Films shot in Berlin
Films shot in Germany